Kroger 200 can mean:
The Kroger 200 (Nationwide), a NASCAR Nationwide Series race held at Lucas Oil Raceway at Indianapolis (formerly Indianapolis Raceway Park), from 1982 through 2011.
The Texas Roadhouse 200, a NASCAR Camping World Truck Series race held at Martinsville Speedway since 2004, and which was titled the Kroger 200 from 2004 to 2015.
The Cheerios Betty Crocker 200, a NASCAR Craftsman Truck Series race held at Richmond International Raceway from 1995 through 2005, and which was titled the Kroger 200 in 2000, 2001 and 2004.